Place Beauvau (English: Beauvau Square) is a public square in the 8th arrondissement of Paris, at the intersection of the Rue du Faubourg-Saint-Honoré, Avenue de Marigny, Rue des Saussaies and Rue de Miromesnil. It is located in the La Madeleine neighbourhood, next to the Élysée Palace.

Hôtel de Beauvau
Place Beauvau is best known for the Hôtel de Beauvau, built by the architect Nicolas Le Camus de Mézières around 1770 for the prince, Charles Juste de Beauvau-Craon. In 1859, the Government of France purchased the building and installed the French governor-general of Algeria there. However, Victor Fialin, the duke of Persigny, who was Minister of the Interior under Napoleon III, arranged for his ministry to be moved from the Rue de Grenelle, in the 7th arrondissement, to this location. 

The Hôtel de Beauvau has housed the Ministry of the Interior since 1861; "Place Beauvau" is often used by French news-gathering organisations as shorthand for the ministry. The buildings to the north of the square are devoted to various services of the ministry.

Nearby places of interest
The Elysée Palace (Palais de l'Elysée), located on the Rue du Faubourg Saint-Honoré, is the official residence of the President of the French Republic, where the president's office is located, and the Council of Ministers meets.
Important foreign visitors are hosted at the nearby Hôtel de Marigny (not a hotel in the English sense, but a palatial residence.)
The Service de Protection des Hautes Personnalités (SPHP) is a French national police unit in charge of the protection of high-profile personalities who visit France.  It is located just a few steps off the Place Beauvau in the Rue de Miromesnil.

Metro station
The Place Beauvau is:
 It is served by lines 1, 8, 9, 12, 13, and 14.

External links 
 Place Beauvau : La face cachée de la police par Jean-Michel Décugis, Christophe Labbé, Olivia Recasens; Robert Laffont, 2006
 L'hôtel de Beauvau
 Sur le site du ministère de l'Intérieur

Beauvau
Buildings and structures in the 8th arrondissement of Paris